Stretching is a form of physical exercise in which a specific muscle or tendon (or muscle group) is deliberately flexed or stretched in order to improve the muscle's felt elasticity and achieve comfortable muscle tone. The result is a feeling of increased muscle control, flexibility, and range of motion. Stretching is also used therapeutically to alleviate cramps and to improve function in daily activities by increasing range of motion.

In its most basic form, stretching is a natural and instinctive activity; it is performed by humans and many other animals. It can be accompanied by yawning. Stretching often occurs instinctively after waking from sleep, after long periods of inactivity, or after exiting confined spaces and areas. Not only vertebrates (mammals and birds), but also spiders were found to exhibit stretching in 2021.

Increasing flexibility through stretching is one of the basic tenets of physical fitness. It is common for athletes to stretch before (for warming up) and after exercise in an attempt to reduce risk of injury and increase performance.

Stretching can be dangerous when performed incorrectly. There are many techniques for stretching in general, but depending on which muscle group is being stretched, some techniques may be ineffective or detrimental, even to the point of causing hypermobility, instability, or permanent damage to the tendons, ligaments, and muscle fiber. The physiological nature of stretching and theories about the effect of various techniques are therefore subject to heavy inquiry.

Though static stretching is a part of some pre and post-workout routines, a review article that was published in January 2020 by the Scandinavian Society of Clinical Physiology and Nuclear Medicine, indicated that pre-exercise static stretching did in fact reduce an individual's overall muscular strength and maximal performance. Furthermore, these findings present a uniform effect, regardless of an individual's age, sex, or training status. For this reason, an active dynamic warm-up is recommended before exercise in place of static stretching.

Physiology 
Studies have shed light on the function, in stretching, of a large protein within the myofibrils of skeletal muscles named titin. A study performed by Magid and Law demonstrated that the origin of passive muscle tension (which occurs during stretching) is actually within the myofibrils, not extracellularly as had previously been supposed. Due to neurological safeguards against injury such as the Golgi tendon reflex, it is normally impossible for adults to stretch most muscle groups to their fullest length without training due to the activation of muscle antagonists as the muscle reaches the limit of its normal range of motion.

Types of stretches 
Stretches can be either static or dynamic, where static stretches are performed while stationary and dynamic stretches involve movement of the muscle during the stretch. Stretches can also be active or passive, where active stretches use internal forces generated by the body to perform a stretch and passive stretches involve forces from external objects or people to perform the stretch. Stretches can involve both passive and active components.

Dynamic stretching
Dynamic stretching is a movement-based stretch aimed at increasing blood flow throughout the body while also loosening up the muscle fibers. Standard dynamic stretches typically involve slow and controlled active contraction of muscles. An example of such a dynamic stretch is lunges. Another form of dynamic stretching is ballistic stretching, which is an active stretch that involves bouncing or swinging back and forth at a high speed in order to take a muscle beyond its typical range of motion using momentum. Ballistic stretching can also be performed with tools such as resistance bands to increase the intention between sets in order to quickly warm-up the body. Ballistic stretching may cause damage to the joints.

Static stretching
The simplest static stretches are static–passive stretches, according to research findings. This brings the joint to its end range of motion and hold it there using external forces. There are more advanced forms of static stretching, such as proprioceptive neuromuscular facilitation (PNF), which involves both active muscle contractions and passive external forces. PNF stretching may involve contracting either the antagonist muscles, agonist muscles, or both (CRAC).

Effectiveness 

 
Stretching has been found both effective and ineffective based on its application for treatment.

Although many people engage in stretching before or after exercise, the medical evidence has shown this has no meaningful benefit in preventing specifically muscle soreness. It may reduce the lactic acid build up in the muscles, making the next workout more bearable.

Stretching does not appear to reduce the risk of injury during exercises, except perhaps for runners. There is some evidence that pre-exercise stretching may increase athletes' range of movement. Also studies highlight that a structured calf stretching programme increases ankle joint dorsiflexion showing that these type of stretching exercises can be employed for first line conservative management of ankle equinus.

There are different positives and negatives for the two main types of stretching: static and dynamic. Static stretching is better at creating a more intense stretch because it is able to isolate a muscle group better. But this intensity of stretching may hinder one's athletic performance because the muscle is being overstretched while held in this position and, once the tension is released, the muscle will tend to tighten up and may actually become weaker than it was previously. Also, the longer the duration of static stretching, the more exhausted the muscle becomes. This type of stretching has been shown to have negative results on athletic performance within the categories of power and speed. However, to be able to do usual daily activities, a certain amount of range of motion is needed from each muscle. For example, the calf muscles are one of the muscle groups that have the most need for adequate flexibility since they are deeply related to normal lower limb function. When the goal is to increase flexibility, the most commonly used technique is stretching. Chronic static stretching was shown to increase range of motion of Dorsiflexion or bringing one's foot closer to their shin by an average of 5.17 degrees in healthy individuals versus 3.77 degrees when solely using ballistic stretching.

Still, ballistic stretching is likely to increase flexibility through a neurological mechanism. The stretched muscle is moved passively to the end range by an external force or agonist muscle: holding a muscle in this position might reduce muscle spindle sensitivity, with repeated stretch applied at the end range inhibiting the Golgi tendon organ.

Dynamic stretching, because it is movement-based, may not isolate the muscle group as well or have as intense of a stretch, but it is better at increasing the circulation of blood flow throughout the body, which in turn increases the amount of oxygen able to be used for athletic performance. This type of stretching has shown better results on athletic performances of power and speed when compared to static stretching.

However, both of these types of stretching have been shown to have a positive impact on flexibility over time by increasing muscle and joint elasticity, thus increasing the depth and range of motion an athlete is able to reach. This is evident in the experiment "Acute effects of duration on sprint performance of adolescent football players". In this experiment, football players were put through different stretching durations of static and dynamic stretching to test their effects. They were tested on maximum sprinting ability and overall change in flexibility. Both static and dynamic stretching had a positive impact on flexibility but, whereas dynamic stretching had no impact on sprint times, static stretching had a negative result, worsening the time the participants were able to sprint the distance in.

Stretching tools 
 BOSU
 Flexcushion
 Foam roller
 Stretch Band

References 

 Iatridou, G., Dionyssiotis, Y., Papathanasiou, J., Kapetanakis, S., & Galitsanos, S. (October/December 2018). "Acute effects of stretching duration on sprint performance of adolescent football players". Muscles, Ligaments & Tendons Journal (MLTJ), 8 (4), 37–42. .

Further reading 
 
 Anderson, Bob (2010).  Stretching: 30th Anniversary Edition. Shelter Publications.
 
 
 Shrier, Ian (2005). "When and Whom to Stretch?" The Physician and Sportsmedicine 33 (3): 22–26. .

External links
 

Stretching